Not to be confused with Air Canada’s fleet of jets 

Air Canada Jetz is a charter airline headquartered in Montreal, Quebec and a wholly owned subsidiary of Air Canada. Established and starting operations on October 31, 2001, it operates a premium business service for corporate clients and professional sports teams. The airline was originally headed by Robert Perrault, former president of Air Alliance. Currently, it is headed by Alain Boudreau.

As of November 2022, Air Canada Jetz operates one Airbus A319 configured with 58 business class seats and five Airbus A320s configured with 66 business class seats.

Charters

Sports teams
Jetz is the official carrier for all seven Canadian teams and one U.S team of the National Hockey League (NHL). It has assumed this role for the Vancouver Canucks, Calgary Flames, Edmonton Oilers, Ottawa Senators, Montreal Canadiens and Toronto Maple Leafs since its inception, with the Winnipeg Jets added for the 2011–2012 season. Since its inception into the NHL in 2021, the Seattle Kraken have chosen Jetz as its official carrier. Jetz has also been the carrier for several US-based NHL franchises, including the Boston Bruins for the 2008 season, the Anaheim Ducks for the 2009–2010 season, the Los Angeles Kings for the 2011–2012 season, and the Washington Capitals for the 2010–2011 season.

On March 31, 2014, the Ottawa Citizen reported that Air Canada "has made a decision to exit this segment of the market." However, service has not been terminated, and on March 17, 2015, the company announced a 6-year contract with several NHL teams starting from the 2015–2016 season.

Jetz was also the carrier of the Toronto Raptors of the National Basketball Association (NBA) until 2016 when they switched to Delta Air Lines, and since April 2010, the Toronto Blue Jays of Major League Baseball (MLB). This was the first time Jetz operated sport charters during the summer.

The Dallas Stars began using Air Canada Jetz starting with the 2022 Stanley Cup Playoffs.

Others
In 2005–2006, Jetz carried U2 on their Vertigo Tour, and again in 2009 on their U2 360 Tour. Jetz also carried The Rolling Stones on their North American tour until the band felt the Jetz Aircraft was not large enough and transferred to a Boeing 747-400.  Jetz has carried many other high-profiled rock bands (Bruce Springsteen, Phil Collins, The Spice Girls) and business executives.

During the 2004, 2006 and 2008 federal elections, NDP Leader Jack Layton's tour was carried by Jetz.

During the COVID-19 pandemic, all of Jetz began operating commercial flights from Toronto to Montreal and Ottawa starting on June 1.

During the 2021 federal election, both Liberal Party of Canada leader Justin Trudeau and Conservative Party of Canada leader Erin O'Toole's campaign tours chartered Air Canada Jetz aircraft.

Fleet

References

External links

Air Canada Jetz
Informational brochure

Air Canada
Airlines established in 2001
Charter airlines of Canada
Star Alliance affiliate members